Tulem Rural District is a rural district (dehestan) in Tulem District, Sowme'eh Sara County, Gilan Province, Iran. At the 2006 census, its population was 9,451, in 2,597 families. The rural district has 21 villages.

References 

Rural Districts of Gilan Province
Sowme'eh Sara County